The Reka (literally, 'river' in Slovene), also the Inner Carniola Reka, is a river that starts as Big Creek in Croatia, on the southern side of Mount Snežnik, and flows through western Slovenia, where it is also initially known as Big Creek. At the village of Škocjan it disappears underground through Škocjan Caves (a UNESCO World Heritage Site), flowing  underneath the Slovenian Karst. The river continues as part of the Timavo in Italy. Tracer studies have shown that it also feeds springs elsewhere on the Adriatic Coast between Trieste and Monfalcone. It has a pluvial regime.

References

External links

 Condition of Reka at Cerkvenikov Mlin and Škocjan - graphs, in the following order, of water level and flow data for the past 30 days (taken by ARSO)

Rivers of the Slovene Littoral
Rivers of Inner Carniola
Rivers of Croatia
International rivers of Europe
Sinking rivers
Drainage basins of the Adriatic Sea
Natura 2000 in Slovenia